Raka can refer to:

 A Turkish rendering of the Arabic geographical name Raqqa
 Raka'ah, one unit of Islamic prayer, or Salaa
 Raka Maomao
 Rajdhani College
 Raka, Burkina Faso
 Raka, Tibet
 Raka, Krško, a village in the Municipality of Krško, southeastern Slovenia
 Raka, Järva County, village in Ambla Parish, Järva County, Estonia
 Raka, Rapla County, village in Rapla Parish, Rapla County, Estonia
 "Raka", a poem in Afrikaans by Nicolaas Petrus van Wyk Louw
 Raka, a 2019 EP by Australian artists Golden Features and The Presets

See also
 Rakah (disambiguation)
 Kate Challis RAKA Award